Juan Alvarado Nieves (July 30, 1961 – October 15, 2013) was a Mexican Luchador (professional wrestler). He was best known under the ring name El Brazo (Spanish for "the Arm"), which he used since his debut in 1980. Alvarado was part of the Alvarado wrestling family, which includes his father Shadito Cruz, five brothers who used the "Brazo" name at some point and several third-generation wrestlers.

Professional wrestling career
Alvarado made his debut as "El Brazo", an Enmascarado (masked wrestler) who worked mainly in Tag team action with his brothers who worked as Brazo de Oro ("Gold arm") and Brazo de Plata ("Silver Arm"). Los Brazos, as they were billed, wrestled all over Mexico and made appearances for the Los Angeles based "NWA Hollywood Wrestling". Over the years Brazo de Plata and his brothers competed in a large number of Luchas de Apuestas ("Bet fights") where they put their masks or hair on the line against their opponents. Los Brazos' most famous Luchas de Apuestas occurred on October 21, 1988, when Brazo de Plata, Brazo de Oro and El Brazo all placed their masks on the line in a match against another well known Lucha libre family, Los Villanos, in this case Villano I, Villano IV and Villano V. The match was the culmination of a long feud (Storyline) between the two families and saw all six wrestlers bleed profusely during the bout. In the end Los Villanos won the match forcing all three Brazos to unmask and reveal their real names as its tradition in these types of matches. Despite losing their masks Los Brazos remained successful in the ring winning various tag team and trios titles such as the UWA World Tag Team Championship, UWA World Trios Championship, WWA World Tag Team Championship and the WWA World Trios Championship By the 1990s Los Brazos worked mainly for Consejo Mundial de Lucha Libre (CMLL) where Brazo de Plata, Brazo de Oro and El Brazo won the CMLL World Trios Championship from Los Infernales (Pirata Morgan, Satánico and MS-1) on April 6, 1993. Los Brazos lost the titles to Dr. Wagner, Jr., Gran Markus, Jr. and El Hijo del Gladiador.

Los Brazos began teaming less and less with Brazo de Oro working more backstage in CMLL. El Brazo began working under various ring names such as Tio Lucas, Latin Boiler, Ingordable and La Puerca, but his expanding waist line made it hard to hide who was actually behind the various gimmicks. In 2008 El Brazo signed with Asistencia, Asesoría y Administración (AAA) and quickly inserted himself in his brother Brazo de Plata's storyline with a group known as Los Guapos VIP. Initially it looked like El Brazo was siding with his brother, only to turn on him and join Los Guapos VIP, taking the (storyline) control of the Los Guapos VIP group. The storyline fight of the two brothers came to a crescendo at Guerrera de Titanes 2008, where they faced off in a steel cage match where the loser would have his hair shaved off. El Brazo lost and had his hair shaved to put at least a temporary end to the storyline. On November 5, 2011, El Brazo debuted a new exótico persona, La Braza, and aligned himself with Cassandro and Pimpinela Escarlata in their battle with fellow exóticos Nygma, Pasión Cristal, Polvo de Estrellas and Yuriko.

Other media
El Brazo has appeared in the video game Lucha Libre AAA: Héroes del Ring

Death
Alvarado died on October 15, 2013, due to complications from diabetes. Alvarado was inducted into the AAA Hall of Fame on August 17, 2014, at Triplemanía XXII.

The Alvarado Family

The Alvarado wrestling family spans three generations starting with Shadito Cruz followed by his 6 sons and a third-generation who have begun wrestling in recent years, which includes Juan Alvarado's son that works as "El Brazo, Jr.". All second-generation Alvarados use wrestling names with the term "Brazo" in it, El Brazo (Juan Alvarado Nieves), Brazo de Oro (Jesús Alvarado Nieves), Brazo de Plata (José Alvarado Nieves), Brazo de Platino ("Platinum Arm"; Daniel Alvarado Nieves), Super Brazo (Martin Alvarado Nieves) and Brazo Cibernetico (Cybernetic Arm; José Aarón Alvarado Nieves).

† = deceased

Championships and accomplishments
Asistencia, Asesoría y Administración
AAA Hall of Fame (Class of 2014)
Consejo Mundial de Lucha Libre
CMLL World Trios Championship (1 time) – with Brazo de Oro and Brazo de Plata
Mexican National Trios Championship (3 times) – with Brazo de Oro and Brazo de Plata (2), Brazo de Plata & Super Elektra (1)
Comision de Box y Lucha Distrito Federal
Distrito Federal Trios Championship (1 time) – with Brazo de Oro and Brazo de Plata
Distrito Federal Tag Team Championship (1 time) – with Brazo de Plata
Federacion Internacional de Lucha Libre
FILL Trios Championship (1 time) – with Brazo de Oro and Brazo de Plata
International Wrestling Revolution Group
Legado Final (2011) – with El Hijo del Brazo
Universal Wrestling Association
UWA World Trios Championship (3 times) – with Brazo de Oro and Brazo de Plata
World Wrestling Association
WWA World Trios Championship (1 time) – with Brazo de Oro and Brazo de Plata
Wrestling Observer Newsletter
Wrestling Observer Newsletter Hall of Fame (Class of 2021) as part of Los Brazos

Luchas de Apuestas record

See also
 List of exóticos

Footnotes

References

External links
AAA profile

1961 births
2013 deaths
Alvarado wrestling family
Deaths from diabetes
Mexican male professional wrestlers
Professional wrestlers from Mexico City
Exóticos
Mexican National Trios Champions
20th-century professional wrestlers
CMLL World Trios Champions
UWA World Trios Champions
21st-century professional wrestlers